This is a list of electoral district results for the 1956 New South Wales state election.

Results by electoral district

Albury

Armidale

Ashfield

Auburn

Balmain

Bankstown

Barwon

Bathurst

Blacktown

Bondi

Bulli

Burrinjuck

Burwood

Byron

Canterbury

Casino

Castlereagh

Cessnock

Clarence

Cobar

Collaroy

Concord

Coogee

Cook's River

Croydon

Drummoyne

Dubbo

Dulwich Hill

Earlwood

East Hills

Eastwood

Fairfield

Georges River

Gloucester

Gordon

Gosford

Goulburn

Granville

Hamilton

Hartley 

The sitting member for Hartley, Jim Chalmers, unsuccessfully contested [[Results of the 1956 New South Wales state election#Nepean|Nepean]].

Hawkesbury

Hornsby

Hurstville

Illawarra

Kahibah 

Joshua Arthur resigned as a result of the Royal Commission concerning his relationship with Reginald Doyle. Tom Armstrong  won the resulting by-election.

King

Kogarah

Kurri Kurri

Lake Macquarie

Lakemba

Lane Cove

Leichhardt

Lismore

Liverpool

Liverpool Plains

Maitland

Manly

Maroubra

Marrickville

Monaro

Mosman

Mudgee

Murray

Murrumbidgee

Nepean

Neutral Bay

Newcastle

North Sydney

Orange

Oxley

Paddington

Parramatta

Phillip

Raleigh

Randwick

Redfern

Rockdale

Ryde

South Coast

Sturt

Sutherland

Tamworth

Temora

Tenterfield

Upper Hunter

Vaucluse

Wagga Wagga

Waratah

Waverley

Willoughby

Wollondilly

Wollongong−Kembla

Woollahra

Young

See also 

 Candidates of the 1956 New South Wales state election
 Members of the New South Wales Legislative Assembly, 1956–1959

Notes

References 

1956